Adenodolichos rhomboideus is a plant in the legume family Fabaceae, native to tropical Africa.

Description
Adenodolichos rhomboideus grows as a subshrub. Inflorescences are terminal, featuring crimson or purple flowers.

Distribution and habitat
Adenodolichos rhomboideus is native to the Democratic Republic of the Congo, Angola, Zambia, Malawi and Mozambique. Its habitat is in woodland.

References

rhomboideus
Flora of the Democratic Republic of the Congo
Flora of South Tropical Africa
Plants described in 1881